Purva Bedi is an American actress. She has appeared in many television serials and several films, including Green Card Fever, American Desi, and Cosmopolitan. She has also starred in an episode of House. Her most recent appearance is as Clare on the TV teen drama Gossip Girl. In 2020, she appeared in the drama film, The Surrogate.

She was born in Chandigarh but grew up in Belgium and the United States. She is the daughter of Columbia University professor Susham Bedi.

Filmography

Film

Television

References

External links
 Purva Bedi's Official Website
 
"Dreams to dust", The Hindu, 15 March 2004

1970s births
Living people
Actresses from Chandigarh
Indian emigrants to the United States
American film actresses
American television actresses
American stage actresses
American actresses of Indian descent
21st-century American women
21st-century American actresses